Gilberto Ramírez Sánchez (born 19 June 1991) is a Mexican professional boxer. He held the WBO super middleweight title from 2016 to 2019, and is the first boxer from Mexico to win a major world title in that weight class. As of November 2022, Ramírez is ranked as the world's third best active light heavyweight by The Ring magazine, the Transnational Boxing Rankings Board, and BoxRec.

Professional career

Early career 
In April 2010, Ramírez beat veteran Jesus Ayala by second-round knockout (KO) in Mazatlán, Sinaloa, Mexico.

On 17 December 2010, Ramírez knocked out the undefeated Rogelio Medina to win the vacant WBC Youth middleweight title. The bout was held at the Gimnasio German Evers in Mazatlán, Sinaloa, Mexico. Starting from 2011, Ramírez moved up to super-middleweight. In his first fight of the year, Ramírez fought 32 year old Antonio Arras and knocked him out via technical knockout (TKO) in round eight. Ramírez next stopped Francisco Villanueva in seven rounds. In July 2011, Ramírez moved back down middleweight to defend his WBC Youth title. He successfully defended the title beating Oney Valdez, Amilcar Edgardo Funes Melian and Samuel Miller all inside the distance. Ramírez went ten rounds with Jaime Barboza (17–6, 8 KOs). Ramírez won via unanimous decision (100–90, 100–91, 97–93). Ramírez next fought at super middleweight against Isaac Mendez, winning via TKO in round eight. Ramírez then went down to middleweight successfully defending the WBC Youth title a final two times against Richard Gutierrez, who Ramírez beat on all scorecards (100–90) and Marcus Upshaw, also winning via ten-round unanimous decision (98–92, 99–90 twice). According to sources in February 2013, Ramírez was on the verge of signing with promotional company Top Rank. This was later revealed to be true.

Fighting in the United States 
Ramírez fought in the United States for the first time in his career on 24 August 2013 at the Civic Auditorium, Glendale, California. His opponent was American Derrick Findley in a scheduled ten-round bout which went the distance. Ramírez won on all three scorecards (100–90 x3). In February 2014, Ramírez defeated Don Mouton at the Laredo Energy Arena, Laredo, Texas. 35 year old Mouton, who had not been stopped in 20 previous professional bouts, was knocked out in round one. Two months later, Ramírez  fought at Mandalay Bay Resort & Casino against his most credible opponent to date, 33 year old Giovanni Lorenzo (33–6, 25 KOs). Lorenzo was knocked down in round one, and twice in the fifth. Ramírez claiming the win via TKO and winning the vacant NABF super middleweight title and vacant WBO NABO super middleweight title. Ramírez averaged 30 landed punches per round.

Ramírez had a one off fight in Macau on the undercard of Rigondeaux-Kokietgym title fight. He defeated Junior Talipeau (20–2–1, 7 KOs) via first-round TKO, after knocking him down three times, in the process winning the vacant WBO Inter-Continental super middleweight title. Ramírez was back in US in November 2014 at the Alamodome, San Antonio, Texas, this time beating Fulgencio Zúñiga via eighth-round TKO to retain the titles. Zuniga's glove touched the canvas in round six, but the referee did not credit Ramírez with the knockdown. In round eight, Ramírez unleashed a barrage of punches which were unanswered, convincing the referee to stop the fight. Ramírez had an 80% knockout ratio after this fight, and it would be the last time he won inside the distance until seven fights later on 3 February 2017.

Rising up the ranks 
On 18 December 2014 Top Rank matchmaker Brad Goodman announced that Ramírez would take on his toughest challenge to date on the undercard of Alvarado-Rios at the 1st Bank Center in Broomfield, Colorado against Russian boxer Maxim Vlasov (30–1, 15 KOs) on 24 January 2015. The bout was set for a catchweight of 171 pounds and would mark the first time Ramírez fought on HBO. Ramírez defeated Vlasov in a closely contested ten round bout (96–94 & 97–93 twice). Ramírez landed 179 of 631 punches thrown (28%) and Vlasov landed 115 of his 411 thrown (28%).

On 18 April, it was announced that Ramírez would return to the ring on 12 June against 35 year old Derek Edwards (27–4–1, 14 KOs) on TruTV. It was pushed back two weeks to take place on 26 June instead. The fight took place at the State Farm Arena in Hidalgo, Texas as Ramírez defeated Edwards via a ten-round decision. Ramírez won every round on all three judges' scorecards. Ramírez was the quicker boxer and used his reach advantage to box on the outside. Although there was exchanges throughout the fight, Ramírez was getting the better of them, landing the harder shots. Edwards' trainer Jeff Mayweather advised him to get closer and work on the inside, but he was unable to do so due to the reach and size advantage of Ramírez. The referee nearly stopped the fight before round eight ended when Edwards appeared hurt, but he managed to recover and make it to the end of the round. With the win, Ramírez moved closer to a potential world title fight after being ranked in the top 3 by the WBA, WBC, IBF, and WBO.

On 12 September, another edition of Top Rank's Metro PCS Friday Night Knockout series on TruTV was announced with Ramírez appearing on the undercard on 20 November. His opponent was later announced as 27 year old Dutch boxer Gevorg Khatchikian (23–1, 11 KOs) for a scheduled ten round fight at The Cosmopolitan of Las Vegas, Chelsea Ballroom, Las Vegas. Ramírez won on all scorecards (99–91 & 100–90 twice). After the fight, he said, "We came to win and that's what we did. All of the hard work and preparation paid off."  With the win, Ramírez became the first boxer to successfully defend the NABF super middleweight title four times.

WBO super middleweight champion

Ramírez vs. Abraham 
It was announced on 18 January 2016 that #1 WBO Ramírez would be fighting WBO super middleweight champion Arthur Abraham (44–4, 29 KOs) in the co-feature bout on the 9 April undercard of the Manny Pacquiao vs. Timothy Bradley III card on HBO pay-per-view. Ramírez followed an intense training regimen in his hometown of Mazatlán before the fight. The fight card took at the MGM Grand in Las Vegas, Nevada. Ramírez put his name in Mexican boxing history, becoming the first fighter to win a super middleweight world title. All three judges scored the fight 120–108 for Ramírez, who also became only the second Mexican to win a world title in a division heavier than middleweight, the first one having been Julio César González as the WBO light heavyweight champion in 2003. Ramírez won on the punch count by outworking Abraham all night in almost very round. In the post fight interview, Ramírez said, "I took to him a Mexican boxing school. He was a very, very strong puncher, but he couldn't take any movement. I knew halfway through the fight I was going to win the fight. I came here to make history, and I did it." Ramírez improved his record to (34–0, 24 KOs).

On 31 May 2016, Top Rank promoter Bob Arum announced that Ramírez would fight on the undercard of the Terence Crawford-Viktor Postol unification fight on 23 July. Ramírez (34–0, 24 KOs), of Mexico, would have been making his first title defense against Germany's 28 year old Dominik Britsch (32–2–1, 11 KOs). Britsch had won four fights in a row since an eight-round decision loss in 2014, was about to take a big step up in competition. On 6 July, Ramírez suffered a hand injury while training, which ultimately called off the world title fight. Ramírez had a successful hand surgery and according to promoter Bob Arum, he should be able to make a ring return by the end of 2016.

Ramírez vs. Bursak 
In January 2017, negotiations were taking place for a fight between Ramírez and Matt Korobov (27–1, 14 KOs) possibly on the undercard of the potential Manny Pacquiao-Jeff Horn fight in April. Bob Arum announced on 13 February 2017 that Ramírez would be making his first defence in Los Angeles, California on April 22. It was also announced that Max Bursak (33–4–1, 15 KOs) would be the challenger. Ramírez retained his WBO title in his first fight in over a year as he won every round on all three judges scorecards (120–106). Bursak tried to attack and managed to land some punches, but lacked the punching power to hurt Ramírez who used his footwork to evade any punishment. Bursak was deducted a point in round five and also in round eleven for excessive holding.

Ramírez vs. Hart 
On 19 June 2017, manager and trainer Hector Zápari announced a deal was in the works for Ramírez to defend his WBO title against mandatory challenger and WBO NABO titleholder Jesse "Hard Work" Hart (22–0, 18 KOs) with the fight possibly taking place in September 2017. It was revealed the fight would take place on 22 September 2017 in Tucson, Arizona. On 22 August the fight was made official and an announcement was made for the venue. The fight was to take place at the Convention Center. Hart stated that he wanted to win the WBO title for his father and trainer Eugene "Cyclone" Hart, a former professional boxer who fought in the Golden Ages of middleweights in the 1970s. His most famous opponent was Marvelous Marvin Hagler, which saw Hart lose via TKO. Hart never received a world title fight. Top Rank promoter Bob Arum credited Eugene Hart as being 'the hardest-punching middleweight of his time'.

In front of 4,103 fans, Ramírez retained his WBO super middleweight title in a hard-fought battle against a game Hart, which went the twelve round distance. The final judges scorecards were 115–112 twice, and 114–113 in favour of Ramírez. He started off strong, dropping Hart in round two following a left uppercut, which Hart did not see coming. Hart beat the count and survived the round. In round four, Hart took tremendous punishment, but managed to stay on his feet. The last six rounds saw the fight turnaround in favour of Hart. He landed many power shots to the head of Ramírez, who held his own. Ramírez seemed to have tired out during the closing rounds. Round eleven saw Hart rock Ramírez badly, but not realizing that his legs had given way, thus failing to go for the finish. Had Hart not been dropped in round two, the fight would have ended via majority decision. After the fight, Ramírez said, "This one was for all the Dreamers, all the people of Mexico and what they are going through with the earthquake. The plan was push, push, push and put a lot of pressure on him and keep him off balance. I wanted to put on a really big body attack every round. There was nothing easy in this fight." Hart was humble in defeat, "I take nothing away from him. He's a good champ. He has my respect. The knockdown was my fault. Zurdo's a really good fighter." Ramírez landed 220 punches from 690 thrown (32%), this included 40 of his 70 power shots thrown. Hart landed 132 of his 497 thrown (27%). The whole card averaged 706,000 viewers on ESPN.

Ramírez vs. Ahmed 
Top Rank's Bob Arum spoke to Boxing Scene on 24 October 2017 outlining the future for Ramírez. He stated that Ramírez would return on 3 February 2018 in the United States, then return to Mazatlán, Mexico, which would mark his first fight in his home country since April 2013 and then likely see a third fight in 2018 possibly in Australia. Arum mentioned Australia boxer Rohan Murdock (20–1, 15 KOs) as a potential opponent.

On 14 November, Arum announced WBO Africa titleholder and #6 WBO ranked Habib "Wild Hurricane" Ahmed (22–0, 17 KOs) would challenge Ramírez on 3 February 2018. This would mark the first ever fight outside his native Ghana for Ahmed. The fight was scheduled to take place at the American Bank Center in Corpus Christi, Texas. Prior to the fight, Ahmed had won 8 of his last 9 fights via stoppage. In front of 3,200 in attendance Ramírez retained his WBO title against Ahmed via a 6th round stoppage win. Ahmed used his head movement and quick feet to make Ramírez miss a lot of his power shots, but was unable to avoid being hit with body shots. At the time of stoppage, Ramírez had won every round on all three judges scorecards. Ramírez suffered a cut over his left eye in round three from a clash of heads. After the fight, Ramírez said, "I would like to fight with anybody in a unification fight. I want to fight the other champions. I am ready for anyone. I want the winner of the (WBSS) tournament. I want Bob Arum to make that fight.I want to be the best in my division." The fight was stopped at 2:31 in round 6 after an onslaught to the head and body. Ramírez landed 123 of 406 punches thrown (30%) and Ahmed landed only 22 of his 190 (12%). Ahmed never landed more than 7 punches in any round, landing only 1 punch in round four. This was the first time in seven fights, dating back to November 2014, since Ramírez last stopped an opponent. The card averaged 741,000 viewers on ESPN.

Ramírez vs. Angulo 
On 30 April 2018 ESPN's Dan Rafael reported that a deal close to being completed for Ramírez to make a fourth defence against 34-year-old Colombian boxer Roamer Alexis Angulo (23–0, 20 KO) on 30 June at the Chesapeake Energy Arena in Oklahoma City. At the time, Angulo was ranked #10 by the WBO. The card would also include light welterweight prospect Alex Saucedo (27–0, 17 KO) taking on veteran boxer Lenny Zappavigna (37–3, 27 KO). A day later, the bout was confirmed by Top Rank and would air live on ESPN. In front of a small crowd of 5,241 in attendance, Ramírez successfully retained his WBO title in defeating Angulo via unanimous decision. Although Ramírez was the clear winner, the crowd booed as the scores of 120–108, 119–109 and 119–109 were read out. Many media outlets including ESPN had the fight closer. Angulo turned out to be a tougher challenger than expected as he rocked Ramírez on a number of occasions, most notably in the third and seventh rounds, however lack of action on his part led to him losing most rounds. After being hurt by Angulo's hard right hand, Ramírez did well to avoid it for the remainder of the bout. In round twelve, Angulo trapped Ramírez but could not land the right hand. Ramírez, who was not happy with his performance, said, "I tried to do better. I want to go back to training with my team, and we need to keep working, working because I want to be a pound-for-pound fighter. (Angulo) was undefeated. He came in really hungry to come for my belt." Over the last three rounds, Ramírez out landed Angulo 51–28. In total, according to CompuBox Stats, Ramírez landed 178 of 648 punches thrown (28%) and Angulo landed 113 of his 485 thrown (23%). After the bout, Ramírez stated he wanted to unify the super middleweight division. The entire telecast averaged 632,000 viewers.

Ramírez vs. Hart II 
By October 2018, Jesse Hart (25–1, 21 KOs) became the mandatory challenger for Ramírez's WBO title. It was slated the two would have a rematch in December 2018. In November, the fight was officially announced to take place at the American Bank Center in Corpus Christi, Texas on 14 December 2018. Promoter Bob Arum believed both boxers had improved from their first bout, which took place in September 2017 and was a fight of the year candidate. The first bout was also considered as Ramírez's toughest WBO title defence. The bout was to main event the ESPN+ broadcast. The Mexican earned a narrow victory by majority decision, with two 115-113 scorecards and a 114-114.

Light Heavyweight

Move to light heavyweight 
In February, 2019, Ramirez, with the support of his team and Top Rank, announced that he will be moving in weight to seek new fights at light heavyweight.

Ramírez vs. Karpency 
On 12 April 2019, on the Lomachenko vs Crolla undercard, Ramirez made his debut at 175 pounds against former world title challenger Tommy Karpency. Ramirez managed to force Karpency to retire in his corner at the end of the fourth round, throwing 316 punches during the process, landing 83, of which 30 were body shots. Karpency later claimed that his ribs were broken after 30 seconds of action.

In early 2020, the Mexican was ordered by the WBO to fight Eleider Álvarez, but he did not confirm interest. After disagreements with Top Rank, he became a free agent in July 2020.

NABF light heavyweight champion

Ramírez vs. López 
Ramírez knocked out Alfonso Lopez in the tenth round to claim the NABF title in Galveston, Texas. In his first bout in 20 months, Ramirez dropped Lopez in round two and dominated the fight by maintaining range.

Ramírez vs. Bivol 
On 5 November 2022, Ramirez faced WBA Light Heavyweight champion title Dmitry Bivol. Ramirez lost by unanimous decision.

Professional boxing record

See also
List of Mexican boxing world champions

References

External links

Profile of Gilberto Ramírez Sanchez
Gilberto Ramirez - Profile, News Archive & Current Rankings at Box.Live

Southpaw boxers
Middleweight boxers
World super-middleweight boxing champions
World Boxing Organization champions
Boxers from Sinaloa
Sportspeople from Mazatlán
Mexican male boxers
1991 births
Living people
Light-heavyweight boxers